60S ribosomal protein L41 is a protein that in humans is encoded by the RPL41 gene.

Ribosomes, the organelles that catalyze protein synthesis, consist of a small 40S subunit and a large 60S subunit. Together these subunits are composed of 4 RNA species and approximately 80 structurally distinct proteins. This gene encodes a ribosomal protein that is a component of the 60S subunit. The protein, which shares sequence similarity with the yeast ribosomal protein YL41, belongs to the L41E family of ribosomal proteins. It is located in the cytoplasm. The protein can interact with the beta subunit of protein kinase CKII and can stimulate the phosphorylation of DNA topoisomerase II-alpha by CKII. Two alternative splice variants have been identified, both encoding the same protein. As is typical for genes encoding ribosomal proteins, there are multiple processed pseudogenes of this gene dispersed through the genome.

References

External links

Further reading

Ribosomal proteins